Ottehallet Slope is an ice slope between Straumsvola Mountain and Brekkerista Ridge in the Sverdrup Mountains of Queen Maud Land. Mapped by Norwegian cartographers from surveys and air photos by Norwegian-British-Swedish Antarctic Expedition (NBSAE) (1949–52) and air photos by the Norwegian expedition (1958–59) and named Ottehallet (the early-morning slope).

Ice slopes of Queen Maud Land
Princess Martha Coast